Fred Jordan (born c. 1958) is an American college baseball coach, who was the 26th Head Coach of The Citadel Bulldogs baseball team, located in Charleston, South Carolina, he held that position from 1992–2017.  Jordan is a 1979 graduate of The Citadel.

His career coaching record at The Citadel was 831 wins and 706 losses; he is the winningest coach in Citadel and Southern Conference history as well as 5th at The Citadel in winning percentage.  Under Jordan, The Citadel appeared in 7 NCAA Regionals, won 7 Southern Conference baseball tournament championships and claimed 5 SoCon regular season championships.  Jordan coached 35 players that were selected in the Major League Baseball Draft.  Coach Jordan won his 800th game on February 20, 2016 with a 5–4 victory over Virginia Tech.  He was the 27th coach to achieve 800 wins at the Division I level.

Head coaching record

References

1950s births
Living people
Baseball pitchers
The Citadel Bulldogs baseball coaches
The Citadel Bulldogs baseball players
Sportspeople from Charleston, South Carolina
High school baseball coaches in the United States